Palm Beach: Original Motion Picture Soundtrack is a soundtrack album for the Australian comedy drama film, Palm Beach (2019), released on 19 July 2019 by Universal Music Australia. The album has peaked at number 37 on the ARIA Charts.

Singles
An original James Reyne song, "Fearless", written by Joanna Murray-Smith, Rachel Ward and  Reyne was released as the soundtrack's lead single on 5 July 2019. A music video featuring excerpts from the film was released on YouTube on 1 August 2019.

Track listing

Charts

Release history

References

 
2019 soundtrack albums
Pop soundtracks
Rhythm and blues soundtracks
Soul soundtracks
Universal Music Australia albums
Comedy film soundtracks
Drama film soundtracks